Chronicles is the first compilation album by Steve Winwood as a solo artist. The album contains some of his major hits up to this point and new remixes produced by Tom Lord-Alge, who had helped commercialize Winwood's sound on his previous album, Back in the High Life. One track, "Valerie", was originally released as a single for Winwood's 1982 album, Talking Back to the Night. Despite the original single being a commercial flop, the remix of the song included in this album peaked at No. 9 on the US charts and No. 19 in the UK. The album peaked at No. 26 on the Billboard 200 album chart and No. 12 in the UK.

It was Winwood's last release with Island Records, before his departure to Virgin Records.

Track listing

All songs written by Steve Winwood and Will Jennings, unless otherwise noted

"Wake Me Up on Judgment Day" 5:42 from the album Back in the High Life
"While You See a Chance" 4:02 edited from the album Arc of a Diver
"Vacant Chair" (Steve Winwood, Vivian Stanshall) 4:31 edited from the album Steve Winwood
"Help Me Angel" (Remix) 5:03 Original version on Talking Back to the Night
"My Love's Leavin'" (Steve Winwood, Vivian Stanshall) 5:12 from the album Back in the High Life
"Valerie" (Remix) 4:05 Original version on Talking Back to the Night
"Arc of a Diver" (Steve Winwood, Vivian Stanshall) 5:25 from the album Arc of a Diver
"Higher Love" 4:07 from the album Back in the High Life
"Spanish Dancer" 4:35 from the album Arc of a Diver
"Talking Back to the Night" (Remix) 4:06 Original version on Talking Back to the Night

Charts

Weekly charts

Year-end charts

References

Steve Winwood albums
Albums produced by Tom Lord-Alge
1987 compilation albums
Island Records compilation albums